Dmytro Volodymyrovych Borshch (born 22 June 1994) is a Ukrainian professional footballer who plays as a defender.

Career

FC Chernihiv 
In summer 2020, Dmytro Borshch played for FC Chernihiv, the second main team of the city of Chernihiv, just promoted to the Ukrainian Second League. In the season 2020-21. He scored his first goal of the season, away against FC Uzhhorod and, on 11 November 2020, he scored his second goal home against Dinaz Vyshhorod. On 18 August 2021 he led his team in Ukrainian Cup for the Second preliminary round, against Chaika Petropavlivska Borshchahivka in the season 2021–22 getting into the Third preliminary round for the first time for his club. On 22 August 2021 he missed a penalty against AFSC Kyiv at the Chernihiv Arena in Chernihiv. In August 2022 the club was admitted in Ukrainian First League and he commented this great achievement for the club of the city of Chernihiv.On 2 September 2022 with a mutual agreement with the club they decided to end the contract.

Honours
FC Chernihiv
 Chernihiv Oblast Football Championship: 2019

References

External links
 Dmytro Borshch at FC Chernigiv 
 
 

1995 births
Living people
Footballers from Chernihiv
FC Chernihiv players
FC Yunist Chernihiv players
FC Avanhard Koriukivka players
Ukrainian footballers
Ukrainian Second League players
Association football defenders